Hsiao Mei-yu (born 7 January 1985 in Taichung, Taiwan) is a Taiwanese road and track bicycle racer. She participated in the 2006 and 2010 Asian Games. In 2010, she won a gold medal at the women's road race event. In the 2012 Summer Olympics in the Women's road race, she finished over the time limit, and competed in the women's omnium, placing 17th. Hsiao next participated in the 2014 Asian Games and won four medals, including a gold in the women's omnium.

In 2016 Hsiao returned to the Olympic Games in Rio de Janeiro to compete in the Cycling Track Women's Omnium event, where she received 64 points to place 17th, the same placement as at the London Olympics four years earlier. Her best omnium event was the time trial where she ranked seventh. She was the only competitor from Taiwan.

Major results

Track

2006
 3rd  Keirin, Asian Track Championships
2009
 3rd  Omnium, Asian Track Championships
2010
 Asian Track Championships
3rd  Omnium
3rd  Team pursuit
2014
 Asian Games
1st  Omnium
3rd  Team pursuit (with Huang Ting-ying, Tseng Hsiao-chia & Ju I Fang)
3rd  Team sprint (with Huang Ting-ying)
 2nd  Omnium, Asian Track Championships
 2nd Omnium, Hong Kong International Track Cup
 2nd Omnium, Taiwan Hsin-Chu Track International Classic
2015
 Taiwan Hsin-Chu Track International Classic
1st Omnium
2nd Sprint
 3rd  Omnium, Asian Track Championships
 3rd Omnium, Yangyang International Track Competition
2016
 1st Omnium, ITS Melbourne Grand Prix
 1st Omnium, ITS Melbourne DISC Grand Prix
2017
 Asian Track Championships
2nd  Omnium
3rd  500m time trial
 2nd Omnium, China Track Cup

Road

2009
 2nd  Road race, Asian Road Championships
 9th Road race, East Asian Games
2010
 1st  Road race, Asian Games
2011
 1st  Road race, Asian Road Championships
2012
 1st  Road race, Asian Road Championships
 1st Stage 5 Vuelta a El Salvador
2013
 1st  Road race, Asian Road Championships
 5th Overall Tour of Thailand
1st Points classification
1st Stage 3
2014
 1st  Road race, Asian Road Championships
 3rd  Road race, Asian Games
 3rd Overall Tour of Thailand
2015
 2nd  Road race, Asian Road Championships
2019
 2nd Road race, National Road Championships

References

External links

Living people
1985 births
Sportspeople from Taichung
Taiwanese female cyclists
Olympic cyclists of Taiwan
Cyclists at the 2012 Summer Olympics
Cyclists at the 2016 Summer Olympics
Asian Games gold medalists for Chinese Taipei
Asian Games silver medalists for Chinese Taipei
Asian Games bronze medalists for Chinese Taipei
Asian Games medalists in cycling
Cyclists at the 2006 Asian Games
Cyclists at the 2010 Asian Games
Cyclists at the 2014 Asian Games
Medalists at the 2006 Asian Games
Medalists at the 2010 Asian Games
Medalists at the 2014 Asian Games
21st-century Taiwanese women